Live Wire/Blues Power is a blues album by Albert King. It was recorded live in 1968 at the Fillmore Auditorium. Leftovers from the recordings were released on the albums Wednesday Night in San Francisco and Thursday Night in San Francisco.

The album peaked at No. 150 on the Billboard 200.

Production
The album was produced by Al Jackson Jr.

Critical reception
Rolling Stone called the album "one man’s reworking of a classic format to make an intensely personal statement, invoking all the cliches without becoming for one second a cliche itself." The Encyclopedia of Popular Music deemed it a "classic [that] introduced [King's] music to the white rock audience."

Track listing
"Watermelon Man" (Herbie Hancock) – 4:04
"Blues Power" (Albert King) – 10:18
"Night Stomp" (Raymond Jackson, King) – 5:49
"Blues at Sunrise" (King) – 8:44
"Please Love Me" (B.B. King, Jules Taub) – 4:01
"Look Out" (King) – 5:20

Personnel
 Albert King – electric guitar, vocals
 Willie James Exon – guitar
 James Washington – organ
 Roosevelt Pointer – bass
 Son Seals – drums
Technical
Bill Halverson, Ron Capone - engineer
Ivan Nagy - cover photograph

References

Albert King live albums
Albums recorded at the Fillmore
1968 live albums
Albums produced by Al Jackson Jr.
Stax Records live albums
Live blues albums